The United Nations Educational, Scientific and Cultural Organization (UNESCO) World Heritage Sites are places of importance to cultural or natural heritage as described in the UNESCO World Heritage Convention, established in 1972. Cultural heritage consists of monuments (such as architectural works, monumental sculptures, or inscriptions), groups of buildings, and sites (including archaeological sites). Natural features (consisting of physical and biological formations), geological and physiographical formations (including habitats of threatened species of animals and plants), and natural sites which are important from the point of view of science, conservation or natural beauty, are defined as natural heritage. The Netherlands accepted the convention on 26 August 1992, making its natural and historical sites eligible for inclusion on the list.

, there are twelve properties in the Kingdom of the Netherlands inscribed on the World Heritage List. Eleven of those sites are in the Netherlands and one is in Curaçao, in the Caribbean. The Netherlands and Curaçao are both constituent countries of the Kingdom of the Netherlands. Eleven sites are cultural properties and one is a natural property. The first site added to the list was Schokland and Surroundings in 1995. The last two sites on the current list were added in 2021. The transnational site Wadden Sea (the natural site) is shared with Denmark and Germany, the Colonies of Benevolence are shared with Belgium, and the Lower German Limes is shared with Germany. There are currently three properties on the tentative list. One of these sites is entirely in the Netherlands, one is in Curaçao, and one is in Bonaire, which is a special municipality of the Netherlands, located in the Caribbean.



World Heritage Sites 
UNESCO lists sites under ten criteria; each entry must meet at least one of the criteria. Criteria i through vi are cultural, and vii through x are natural.

Tentative list
In addition to sites inscribed on the World Heritage list, member states can maintain a list of tentative sites that they may consider for nomination. Nominations for the World Heritage list are only accepted if the site was previously listed on the tentative list. , the Netherlands has recorded three sites on its tentative list.

References

 
 
Netherlands
Heritage registers in the Netherlands
Netherlands history-related lists
World Heritage Sites